The thalamic fasciculus is a component of the subthalamus. It is synonymous with field H1 of Forel. Nerve fibres form a tract containing cerebellothalamic (crossed) and pallidothalamic (uncrossed) fibres, that is insinuated between the thalamus and the zona incerta.

The thalamic fasciculus consists of fibers from the ansa lenticularis and from the lenticular fasciculus, coming from different portions of the medial globus pallidus, before they jointly enter the ventral anterior nucleus of the thalamus.

References

External links
 http://www.meddean.luc.edu/lumen/MedEd/Neuro/frames/nlDEs/nl06fr.htm
 https://web.archive.org/web/20070419222336/http://www.endotext.org/neuroendo/neuroendo3b/neuroendo3b_2.htm (see figure #12)
 https://web.archive.org/web/20080504234454/http://isc.temple.edu/neuroanatomy/lab/atlas/mdbg/

Thalamic connections